Daniel Joseph Schmid (born November 22, 1962) is an American musician, known for his work as the bassist and co-founder of the ska-swing band the Cherry Poppin' Daddies. Schmid was also part of the rock duo the Visible Men, and has worked with alternative rock musicians such as Black Francis and Pete Yorn.

Career
Schmid was majoring in architecture at the University of Oregon in the early 1980s when he befriended fellow student Steve Perry. Bonding over a mutual love of punk rock, the pair eventually decided to drop out of college together to pursue their musical ambitions, playing together in the punk trio the Jazz Greats and the garage rock group Saint Huck before forming what would eventually become the Cherry Poppin' Daddies in late 1988. Schmid toured and recorded with the Daddies for nearly a decade before leaving the band in 1996, following the birth of his first child and finding the conditions of the band's hectic touring schedule beginning to take a toll on his health (Schmid is asthmatic and has many food allergies). In Schmid's absence, with Darren Cassidy assuming bass guitar duties, the Daddies recorded Zoot Suit Riot, the album which eventually led to the band's commercial breakthrough. In mid-1998, at the height of the Daddies' mainstream popularity, the band's touring conditions had improved enough for Schmid to return to the line-up at Perry's insistence, where he remains to this day.

In 1999, Schmid and Daddies keyboardist Dustin Lanker, both wanting to write music more experimental than what they were doing with the Daddies, formed the rock trio the Visible Men as a side project, playing with a rotating line-up of drummers. Following the Daddies' hiatus in late 2000, Schmid and Lanker turned their attention back towards the Visible Men, recording two independent albums and touring extensively throughout the western half of the United States in the mid-2000s before going on hiatus themselves in 2007. Schmid and Lanker also briefly played together in the Eugene tango band Mood Area 52.

In 2007, Schmid was selected to play in former Pixies singer and then Eugene resident Black Francis' backing band, recording bass guitar on his critically acclaimed album Bluefinger and playing on his international tour supporting the album. Since 2010, Schmid has also been a member of the Eugene punk/garage rock band the Golden Motors.

Schmid currently lives in Eugene with his wife Rachel and their children Violet and Mikah. Outside of his musical career, Schmid made a living as a bartender, as the work schedule proved flexible enough to accommodate his frequent touring with the Daddies. He was a veteran of Eugene's High Street Brewery & Café until 2012, when he joined Plank Town Brewing Company in neighboring Springfield, where he acts as floor manager.

Discography

Cherry Poppin' Daddies
See: Cherry Poppin' Daddies discography for complete recordings
Ferociously Stoned (1990) - bass
Rapid City Muscle Car (1994) - bass (as Dang Oulette)
Kids on the Street (1996) - bass
Soul Caddy (2000) - bass
Susquehanna (2007) - bass
Skaboy JFK (2009) - bass
White Teeth, Black Thoughts (2013) - bass
Please Return the Evening (2014) - bass
The Boop-A-Doo (2016) - bass
Bigger Life (2019) - bass

The Visible Men
In Socks Mode (2002) - Bass
Love:30 (2005) - Bass, guitar

Miscellaneous
Black Francis - Bluefinger (2007) - Bass
Pete Yorn - Pete Yorn (2010) - Bass
The Golden Motors - The Golden Motors (2012) - Bass
Black Francis - Live in Nijmegen (2012) - Bass (recorded in February 2008)

References

1962 births
Living people
Musicians from Portland, Oregon
Musicians from Eugene, Oregon
University of Oregon alumni
American punk rock bass guitarists
American rock bass guitarists
American ska bass guitarists
Guitarists from Oregon
American male bass guitarists
20th-century American bass guitarists
20th-century American male musicians
Cherry Poppin' Daddies members
The Visible Men members